Trinity Valley Community College (TVCC) is a public community college based in Athens, Texas. It has four campuses serving five counties across the southeast and eastern parts of the state.

History 
TVCC was founded in 1946 as Henderson County Junior College in Athens, the county seat. The current name, adopted in September 1986, was taken from the Trinity River, which bisects the region. By that time it had expanded to serve residents of more than one county.

TVCC began its expansion to a multi-site campus in 1969 when it began to offer courses at a nearby Texas Department of Criminal Justice unit.

 In 1972, courses in Palestine were held for the first time and in 1975 TVCC opened a separate campus facility three miles north of Palestine (the Anderson County seat). 
 In 1973 TVCC started offering courses in Terrell (its first expansion into neighboring Kaufman County) and opened a separate campus facility there in 1986.
 In 1983 TVCC opened its first specialized campus, the TVCC Health Science Center in Kaufman (the Kaufman County seat).  As of 2020, the site no longer holds Health Science courses.
 Starting in 2020, TVCC moved the Health Science Center to the former Renaissance Hospital site in Terrell.  One of the buildings at the campus holds High School dual credit courses for Health Science in partnership with Terrell ISD.

Media 
TVCC operates four campuses serving the Texas counties of Anderson, Henderson, Van Zandt, Rains, and Kaufman, southeast of the Dallas-Fort Worth metroplex:
The Henderson County Campus, which also serves as TVCC's headquarters, is in Athens.
The Anderson County Campus is in Palestine.
The Kaufman County Campus is in Kaufman.  This was the former site of the Health Science Center from 1986-2019.
It also operates a distance learning program for the University of Texas at Arlington's RN to BSN program.

As defined by the Texas Legislature, the official service area of TVCC is the following:
all of Anderson, Henderson, Kaufman and Rains counties,
the territory of the Terrell Independent School District located within Hunt County, and
Van Zandt County, excluding those portions within the Grand Saline, Lindale, and Van independent school districts.

Notable alumni and persons affiliated with TVCC
Margene Adkins, professional football player in the NFL 
Darren Benson, professional football player in the NFL 
Matt Bryant, placekicker for the Atlanta Falcons of the National Football League
Rock Cartwright, professional football player in the NFL 
Albert Connell, professional football player in the NFL 
Paul Dawson, college football All-American
Anthony Dickerson, professional football player in the NFL 
Todd Fowler, professional football player in the USFL and NFL 
Al Harris, professional football player in the NFL
Robert Jackson, professional football player in the NFL 
 Tramain Jones, American football defensive back who played in the Arena Football League
Shawn Kemp, professional basketball player in the NBA 1989-2003 
Roger Muñoz, member of the Nicaragua men's national basketball team
John Randle, professional football player in the NFL and Hall of Famer
James Scott, professional football player in the NFL
James Surls, sculptor.
Nick Van Exel, professional basketball player in the NBA 1993-2006 
Betty Lennox, of the Minnesota Lynx, Miami Sol, Cleveland Rockers, Seattle Storm, Atlanta Dream, Los Angeles Sparks and Tulsa Shock in the Women's National Basketball Association (WNBA), played for the Trinity Valley Community College Lady Cards basketball team during her sophomore year in 1997.
Derrick Willies, professional football player in the NFL
Todd Staples, former Texas Commissioner of Agriculture, is a former faculty member at the Palestine campus.

References

External links
Official website

Education in Anderson County, Texas
Education in Henderson County, Texas
Education in Kaufman County, Texas
Universities and colleges accredited by the Southern Association of Colleges and Schools
Community colleges in Texas
Two-year colleges in the United States
NJCAA athletics
1946 establishments in Texas